Graham Gibson (born 19 July 1980 in Kirkcaldy, Fife) is a Scottish footballer who last played senior football for Scottish Second Division side Forfar Athletic until 2012.

Career
Gibson started off his career with Fife junior club Lochore Welfare, before making the move into senior football midway through the 2001-2002 season with then Third Division side Brechin City. His ability was recognised by Glasgow side Partick Thistle, who gave him a move up the leagues in 2006, to the First Division, although his time there was short - being sent on loan to East Fife before being released after just over a year to return to the Third Division with Stenhousemuir and then Forfar Athletic.

After football
Since leaving Ballingry, he has been working full-time for The Courier.

References

External links
  (other stats, plus Forfar 09-present)
  (Forfar stats 08/09) 

1980 births
Footballers from Kirkcaldy
Scottish footballers
Association football forwards
Brechin City F.C. players
Partick Thistle F.C. players
East Fife F.C. players
Scottish journalists
Stenhousemuir F.C. players
Forfar Athletic F.C. players
Scottish Football League players
Living people
Scottish Junior Football Association players
Ballingry Rovers F.C. players
Lochore Welfare F.C. players